

The Shober Willie II is an American two-seat sporting or aerobatic aircraft designed and built by Shober Aircraft Enterprises. The aircraft was designed to be sold as plans for amateur construction.

Design
The Willie II is a braced single-bay biplane with a fabric covered welded steel fuselage. The two-spar wooden wings are fabric covered with wide-span ailerons on the lower wing and a fabric covered wired-braced welded steel tail unit. The prototype is powered by a  Lycoming O-360-A3A four-cylinder piston engine. It has two open cockpits in tandem and a fixed conventional landing gear with a tailwheel.

Specifications (Prototype)

See also

References

Notes

Bibliography

1970s United States sport aircraft
Homebuilt aircraft
Biplanes
Single-engined tractor aircraft
Aircraft manufactured in the United States
Aerobatic aircraft
Aircraft first flown in 1971